Kanali is a seaside village and a community in the Preveza regional unit, northwestern Greece. It was the seat of the former municipality Zalongo. The community consists of the villages Kanali, Kastrosykia, Mazi, Nea Thesi and Pidima Kyras. Kanali is situated on the Ionian Sea coast, 13 km north of Preveza.

The village Kastrosykia, 6 km northwest of Kanali, is the location of a city of ancient Epirus, probably of a port of Cassope.

References 

Populated places in Preveza (regional unit)